Julie Birungi alias (Julie Naluggya, Julie Mutesasira) was born on 27 February 1978) is a Canadian-Ugandan gospel singer and muscian known in Uganda and across East Africa for her songs like Nkulembera, Lwana Nabo, Ekikunyumira and Bamuyita Yesu, a collaboration with Iryn Namubiru.

She received the best female gospel song award for her song Saba in 2014 and the Best Religious Song award for her song List Ya Mukama in 2015 and was nominated for Best Religious Song for her song Kijja Kugwa in 2016 at the third, fourth and fifth HiPipo Music Awards respectively. She won the Song of the year  award at the Olive Gospel Music Awards in 2012, the Female artist of the year award at VIGA Awards in 2016, Diva Collabo Award for Yani, a collaboration with Iryn Namubiru at the 2011 DIVA Awards.

Personal life and carrier
Julie parents are the late Henry Ssebatta and Rose Lutwama.
Julie Mutesaira was married to Pastor Steven Mutesaira of the Redeemed of the Lord Evangelistic Church, Kamwookya and they are now divorced. The couple had three children, two of whom, Esther and Ezekiel, were the winners of East Africa's Got Talent in 2019.  The couple divorced in 2016 and she relocated to Canada. In 2020, she publicly revealed that she is a lesbian and the same year was married to her wife Jean.

Julie recorded her first single titled Nakwagala in 2004.

Discography

References

1978 births
Canadian gospel singers
Living people
21st-century Ugandan women singers
Ganda people
Ugandan LGBT people
Canadian LGBT singers
Musicians from Kampala